Deighton pronounced as Dee-ton  is a district of Huddersfield, West Yorkshire, England.

Deighton was formerly known as East Bradley, and Bradley was called West Bradley. The name changed when the Deighton family bought the area stretching from Screamer Woods (near the Deighton Fields) to Sheepridge and Brackenhall.

Deighton has a railway station on the Huddersfield Line for services to Huddersfield, Leeds and Wakefield. The typical journey time to Huddersfield is usually 7 minutes, to Wakefield Westgate 31 minutes and to Leeds 34 minutes.

The Deighton Centre was a place for educational, training and leisure activities.  It was formerly a high school for Deighton, Bradley and Brackenhall students. Deighton High School closed on 31 August 1992, and most students and some staff were relocated to Fartown High School. The centre was refurbished as a sports/music venue,  and utilised by the Local Authority, Kirklees Council, for staff training.  Next door to the centre, the Deighton Sports Arena was developed which houses a gym, squash court and basketball court and is a venue for dancehall music. In March 2016 the Deighton Centre was demolished.

The chemical company, Syngenta has a large plant off the A62 Leeds Road.

Leeds Road Playing Fields has football, cricket and all-weather pitches, a sports hall and an athletics track. Home to Kirklees Ladies FC.

Deighton Carnival
Deighton is a multi-racial district and home to Deighton Carnival in late June every year organised by Fresh Horizons - A community based social enterprise group based in Deighton. The carnival started in 2002 and attracts 3,000 people from Deighton and the rest of Huddersfield. It starts with a procession of floats playing Reggae Dancehall, Bassline, RnB, Garage Drum and Bass and Reggae on the road, costumed bands make up more of the procession including Suga Brown dance group, "Whitacre TRA" and Bradley Junior and Infant and Ashbrow Junior and Infant schools.

References

External links

Areas of Huddersfield